Ghalanai is the largest town and headquarters of Mohmand District in Khyber Pakhtunkhwa, province of Pakistan. It is located at 34°19'16N 71°24'0E with an altitude of 651 metres (2139 feet).

References

Ghalanai consist of six main villages, miangan, wazir kalay,pagul kor, Gigyani, naway kaly and buneer kaly in which Ghalanai Akhonzadgan is  the oldest village and the village called Ghalanai akhonzadgan and later the other
Surrounding villages adopted the name and now Ghalanai is expanding.

Populated places in Mohmand District